West End is a neighborhood of St. Louis, Missouri.  This neighborhood is defined by Page Boulevard on the North, Delmar Boulevard on the South, Belt Avenue and Union Boulevard via Maple Avenue on the East, and City limits on the West. The neighborhood is home to the Emmanuel DeHodiamont House, one of the two oldest houses in St. Louis.

Demographics

In 2020 West End's population was 71.5% Black, 10.5% White, 0.4% Native American, 6.8% Asian, 5.4% Two or More Races, and 5.4% Some Other Race. 7.7% of the population was of Hispanic or Latino Origin.

References

Neighborhoods in St. Louis